Vincent Soler (7 June 1928 – 18 August 2012) was an Algerian racing cyclist. He rode in the 1951 Tour de France.

References

External links
 

1928 births
2012 deaths
Algerian male cyclists
Place of birth missing
21st-century Algerian people